Cedric Bixler-Zavala (born November 4, 1974) is an American singer and songwriter. He is the lead singer and lyricist of the progressive rock band The Mars Volta and the only constant member of the post-hardcore group At the Drive-In, for which he is the lead singer and occasional guitarist. He is also the lead singer of the band Antemasque, and sings and plays guitar in his band Zavalaz.

Early life
Bixler-Zavala was born in the United States to Mexican parents, Dennis Jose Bixler and Rosa Maria Zavala. His parents were bilingual, but Bixler-Zavala says his command of proper Spanish is limited to "Spanglish". His Spanish maternal surname, Zavala, is a Castilian version of Zabala, of Basque origin. The earliest paternal ancestors on his mother's side were fishermen and traders from the Basque region of Gipuzkoa and were employed by the Spanish government as colonists to the Spanish Louisiana.

In the early 1990s, Bixler-Zavala played drums and was a vocalist for a band named Foss which included future Texas congressman, senatorial candidate, and presidential candidate Beto O'Rourke on bass.

Artistry
Bixler-Zavala has a tenor voice type, with a range spanning from D2 to C7. His vocal work spans many different styles, ranging from consistent rhythmic shouts (common in his singing with At The Drive-In) to controlled falsetto and head voice singing (a familiar trademark of his singing with the Mars Volta). In 2016, it was also revealed that Bixler-Zavala developed vocal nodules, causing shows to be canceled while on tour.

Bixler-Zavala is fond of Frank Zappaesque humor and writes in English, Spanish, and Latin. His lyrics have a wide vocabulary and often feature complicated wordplay. Bixler-Zavala also uses portmanteaus: combining existing words, or parts of words, to create a new word. The song "Noctourniquet," for example, combines "nocturnal" (active at night) and "tourniquet" (a medical device to stop bleeding). He has stated: "I love to take common sayings, pervert them, mutate them a little. So you think I am singing one thing, but when you read it, it is different." He has described Mark E. Smith of The Fall as "one of the pillars of influence for me as a lyricist".

When performing with At the Drive-in and the Mars Volta, Bixler-Zavala is known for his eccentric on-stage behavior. He frequently does somersaults on stage, swings his microphone (once unintentionally hitting bandmate Ikey Owens in the head), throws objects such as cymbals, microphone stands, and trash cans into the audience, salsa dances, adjusts Omar Rodríguez-López's effects pedals and occasionally plays the maracas.

Solo recordings, collaborations, and Zavalaz
Under the pseudonym "Alavaz Relxib Cirdec" ("Cedric Bixler-Zavala" backwards), Bixler-Zavala contributed a two-song single to the GSL Special 12-inch Singles Series, released in December 2005. Closer to the dub of De Facto and the ambient experimentation shown in Omar Rodríguez-López's records than the prog-rock of the Mars Volta, the two songs Bixler-Zavala has produced under this alias are entirely instrumental.

In 2010, he commented on Facebook about the recording process:

Late 2011 saw the release of the first 7-inch record from Bixler's new project Anywhere, a collaboration with Christian Eric Beaulieu of Triclops! and Mike Watt of The Stooges/Firehose/Minutemen. Their self-titled debut album was released by ATP Records in June 2012.

Bixler has stated that he has been working on an album with the last Mars Volta drummer Deantoni Parks, although it remains unreleased to date.

Since 2011 Bixler was working on another album, which he described as "mostly ballady type stuff... a very sunday morning record. Very soft". Eventually the solo project turned into a full-fledged band named Zavalaz, which features Bixler on lead vocals and guitar, Dan Elkan on guitar, Juan Alderete on bass and Gregory Rogove on drums. The band is set to play a number of West Coast tour dates throughout June, supported by Dot Hacker and EV Kain. On June 3, 2013, a snippet from song "Blue Rose of Grand Street" off their upcoming album All the Nights We Never Met was released on YouTube.

Cedric has been back into the studio after reuniting with Omar Rodríguez-López due to Red Hot Chili Peppers bassist, Flea, wanting them to reunite. They have now formed a supergroup together called Antemasque with ex-Mars Volta drummer Dave Elitch. The band recorded and released their debut in 2014. Fans have cited that as Flea and Dave have played with the Mars Volta prior, a Mars Volta reunion could be in the works. (Flea played bass on 2003's De-loused in the Comatorium and trumpet on 2005's Frances the Mute; Dave played with the Mars Volta from 2009 to 2010.) In February 2018, Bixler Zavala confirmed on Twitter that the Mars Volta will reunite, but later clarified that At the Drive-In activity will take precedence for the immediate future.

Personal life
In 2009, Bixler-Zavala married actress and model Chrissie Carnell. The couple reside in Los Angeles, California. They had their first children, twin boys Ulysses and Xanthus, in 2013. In November 2017, he said in a pair of tweets that actor Danny Masterson had sexually assaulted his wife, and that he wrote At The Drive-In's song "Incurably Innocent" about the alleged incident.

Bixler-Zavala was a member of the Church of Scientology. Bixler-Zavala had credited Scientology with his changed attitude on the use of drugs. He attended the Church of Scientology Celebrity Centre event in 2013. In 2015, Bixler-Zavala spoke about his decision to stop smoking marijuana. "I was spending $1,000 a week on weed," he said, and rationalized his use by believing it made him more creative, when he later came to realize "I was using it to form this stoned bubble that helped me justify not wanting to interact with people." However, by 2017 he had become a harsh critic of Scientology, calling its "self help volcano[...] as barren as a floating needle. A placebo of Sugary kool aid" and accusing it of silencing sexual assault victims and of harassing both him and his wife; in 2018, he accused it of covering up his wife's alleged sexual assault and called it "a modern-day version of The Handmaid's Tale".

In 2020, Bixler-Zavala's dog died after allegedly eating raw meat laced with rat poison that had been tossed into their yard. Bixler-Zavala alleged that the Church of Scientology was responsible, though they have denied the accusations.

Bixler-Zavala's life has been heavily impacted by the deaths of people who have been in close association with him, several of which have become themes for his lyrics. Jimmy Hernandez, bass player for Los Dregtones, died of cancer in 1994. The year after, the original drummer for At The Drive-In, Bernie Rincon, died by suicide. In 1996, a close friend and band-mate of Bixler-Zavala's, Los Dregtones bassist Julio Venegas, also died by suicide. The story behind the Mars Volta's first album De-Loused in the Comatorium was loosely inspired by "life and death of Julio Venegas". During the following year, two of his bandmates of the group The Fall on Deaf Ears, Laura Beard and Sarah Reiser, died in a car accident. in May 2003, their sound manipulator and longtime friend of Bixler-Zavala and Omar Rodríguez-López, Jeremy Ward, was found dead of apparent heroin overdose. In October 2014, Isaiah "Ikey" Owens, former bandmate and keyboardist for Bixler-Zavala's previous bands De Facto and the Mars Volta (the latter from 2001 to 2010), was found dead in Puebla, Mexico, while on tour with Jack White. Owens was 39 years old and his cause of death was later confirmed to be a heart attack.

Bixler-Zavala endorsed 2020 presidential candidate Bernie Sanders and denounced the support of Joe Biden by his former Foss bandmate and 2020 presidential candidate Beto O'Rourke. In response to a fan on Instagram who said that O'Rourke's support of Biden "bummed me out bad", Bixler-Zavala said "me too."

Discography

As Alavaz Relxib Cirdec
The Special 12 Singles Series – "Live Private Booths" / "Sapta Loka" single (2005)

With Antemasque
 Antemasque – LP (2014)

With Anywhere
 Anywhere – LP (2012)
 Light The Portals – LP (2016)
 Anywhere II – LP (2018)

With At the Drive-In
 Hell Paso (1994) – re-release – EP
 Alfaro Vive, Carajo! (1995) – EP
 Acrobatic Tenement (1997, re-release 2004) – LP
 El Gran Orgo (1997) – EP
 In/Casino/Out (1998, re-release 2004) – LP
 Vaya (1999, re-release 2004) – EP
Sunshine / At the Drive-In (2000) – EP
 Relationship of Command (2000, re-release 2004) – LP
 This Station Is Non-Operational (2005) – compilation
 in•ter a•li•a (2017) – LP
 Diamanté (2017) – EP

With Big Sir
Before Gardens After Gardens – LP (2012)

With De Facto
How Do You Dub? You Fight For Dub, You Plug Dub In – LP (1999/2001)
456132015 – EP (2001)
Megaton Shotblast – LP (2001)
Légende du Scorpion à Quatre Queues – LP (2001)

With The Fall on Deaf Ears
 The Fall on Deaf Ears – EP (1996)

With Foss
The El Paso Pussycats (1993) – 7-inch
Foss (1993)
Fewel St. (1994)

With Thee Gambede Meatleak
The Crab, The Bear, The Tiger, The Moose, The Bird (1995)

With Los Dregtones
5 Song Alibi (1994)

With The Mars Volta
 Tremulant – EP (2002)
 De-Loused in the Comatorium – LP (2003)
 Live – EP (2003)
 Frances the Mute – LP (2005)
 Scabdates – LP (2005)
 Amputechture – LP (2006)
 The Bedlam in Goliath – LP (2008)
 Octahedron – LP (2009)
 Noctourniquet – LP (2012)
 The Mars Volta – LP (2022)

With Omar Rodríguez-López
 A Manual Dexterity: Soundtrack Volume 1 (2004)
Omar Rodriguez (2005)
Se Dice Bisonte, No Búfalo (2007)
Calibration (Is Pushing Luck and Key Too Far) (2007)
Old Money (2008)
Cryptomnesia (2009)
Sympathy for Delicious OST – 3 tracks as 'Burnt the Dipthongs'
Telesterion (2011)
Some Need It Lonely (2016)

With Zavalaz
 All Those Nights We Never Met - LP (TBA)

Guest appearances
 Rise Above: 24 Black Flag Songs to Benefit the West Memphis Three – various artists backed by the Rollins Band (2002) ("I've Had It")
 Decomposition – Thavius Beck (2004) ("Amongst The Shadows")
 Burn Right Through – Sand Which Is (2000) ("Plasticity Index")
 White People – Handsome Boy Modeling School (2004) ("A Day In The Life")
Blood Mountain – Mastodon (2006) ("Siberian Divide")
I'll Sleep When You're Dead – El-P (2007) ("Tasmanian Pain Coaster")
Weareallgoingtoburninhellmegamixx2 / Eat My Garbage - El-P (2008) ("Tasmanian Pain Coaster (A Cappella)")
Vivid Green – Nobody (2013) ("Our Last Dance")
Kingdom Of Sleep - Jonny Polonsky (2020) ("Ghost Like Soul")

As producer
Hell Paso by At the Drive-In (1994) co-produced with other members of At the Drive-In
¡Alfaro Vive, Carajo! by At the Drive-In (1995) co-produced with other members of At the Drive-In
El Gran Orgo by At the Drive-In (1997) co-produced with Bryan Jones and other members of At the Drive-In
Sunshine / At the Drive-In by At the Drive-In (2000) co-produced with other members of At the Drive-In
Live by The Mars Volta (2003) co-produced with Omar Rodríguez-López

References

External links

 

1974 births
Living people
Musicians from El Paso, Texas
People from Redwood City, California
At the Drive-In members
American tenors
American rock singers
Maracas players
Singers from California
Singers with a three-octave vocal range
Hispanic and Latino American musicians
Hispanic and Latino American singers
American musicians of Mexican descent
American people of German descent
Chicano rock musicians
Grammy Award winners
American former Scientologists
The Mars Volta members
21st-century American singers
De Facto (band) members
El Grupo Nuevo de Omar Rodriguez Lopez members
Antemasque (band) members